List of Sports Clubs in Colombo. Colombo has many Sports Clubs, covering different sports.

Multi sports
Sinhalese Sports Club
Colombo Cricket Club
Colts Cricket Club
Moors Sports Club
Tamil Union Cricket and Athletic Club
Sri Lanka Army Sports Club
Bloomfield Cricket and Athletic Club
Burgher Recreation Club

Limited sports
Colombo Athletic Club
Royal Colombo Golf Club
Colombo Rowing Club
Colombo FC
Colombo Swimming Club
Ceylon Motor Yacht Club
Colombo Lions, an American football team

Sport in Colombo
Sports clubs in Colombo
Sports clubs
Colombo
Sports clubs